Bambusa albolineata is a species of Bambusa bamboo.

Distribution
It is found in the temperate regions of Asia, mainly China and eastern Asia.

Description
The bamboo is perennial. Its rhizomes are short. It can grow to 600–800 cm long with a maximum width of 35 to 55 mm diameter in a very woody form. It does not produce nodal roots.

References

albolineata